Three Bridges is one of 14 neighbourhoods within the town of Crawley, in the county of West Sussex in England.

History

Three Bridges, at first a tiny hamlet, began to grow with the coming of the London and Brighton Railway in 1841. Despite beliefs to the contrary, the village was named, not after rail bridges, but after three much older crossings over streams in the area (River Mole tributaries).

The hamlet became the site of an important railway junction in 1848 with the opening of the branch line to Horsham and thence to Portsmouth. The railway established a motive power depot and marshalling yards to the south of the village. A further branch line to East Grinstead was opened in 1855. The village changed radically with the coming of the New town development in the Crawley area in the late 1940s. Three Bridges was one of the first group of neighbourhoods to be built, by 2020 there were 14 neighbourhoods.

Railway transport

Three Bridges railway station is an important junction station where the Arun Valley Line to Portsmouth branches off from the Brighton Main Line that runs between London and Brighton. A third line to East Grinstead closed on 1 January 1967.

A rolling stock depot, Three Bridges depot, was constructed in the early 2010s for the Thameslink rolling stock programme

Three Bridges ROC, the main operating centre for the south east, is also located close to Three Bridges station.

Education
Hazelwick School is a comprehensive school located in Three Bridges. It was opened as a Secondary Modern School in 1953, which became a Comprehensive school in the mid 1960s. It is also (since 1998) designated as a Technology and Humanities College. Hazelwick has over 110 teachers and more than 2100 pupils. Many former school pupils later became famous including Gareth Southgate and Chico Slimani. It also educated two of the controversial Fertilizer Bomb plotters, Omar Khyam and Jawad Akbar who were arrested, charged and imprisoned for life sentences due to Government Home Security surveillance during Operation Crevice.

Primary schools in Three Bridges include Three Bridges Primary School.

Sport
 Three Bridges F.C. play in Isthmian League, Division One South East
 Crawley Town F.C. play in Football League Two, the fourth tier of football in England
 Three Bridges Cricket Club play in the Sussex Cricket League
 Crawley Hockey Club plays their home matches at Hazelwick School

References

External links
 Three Bridges Football Club
 Crawley Lawn Tennis Club
 Three Bridges Cricket Club
 Crawley Borough Council
 Hazelwick School
 Three Bridges Station

Neighbourhoods in Crawley